The pound was the currency of British West Africa, a group of British colonies, protectorates and mandate territories. It was equal to one pound sterling and was similarly subdivided into 20 shillings, each of 12 pence.

History 

In the 19th century, the sterling became the currency of the British West African territories and standard issue British coinage circulated. The West African territories in question were Nigeria, the Gold Coast (now Ghana), Sierra Leone and the Gambia.

In 1912, the authorities in London set up the West African Currency Board and issued a distinctive set of sterling coinage for use in British West Africa. The circumstance prompting this move was a tendency for standard sterling coins shipped to the West African territories to leave the region and return to circulation in the UK, causing a local dearth of coinage. A unique British West African variety of sterling coinage would not be accepted in the shops of Britain and so would remain in circulation locally.

There was a precedent for this move: in 1910, Australia had already commenced issuing its own distinctive varieties of sterling coinage, but the reasons for doing so were quite different from those relating to British West Africa. Australian authorities issued local coinage as a step towards introducing a separate currency with a flexible exchange rate against sterling, while no such plan was considered for British West Africa. With the exception of Jamaica where special low denomination coins were issued in place of the British copper coins, due to local superstitions surrounding the use of copper coinage for church collections, authorities in London did not replace any sterling coins with local issues for any other British colony. 

The British West African pound was also adopted by Liberia in 1907, replacing the Liberian dollar, although it was not served by the West African Currency Board. Liberia changed to the US dollar in 1943. Togo and Cameroon adopted the West African currency in 1914 and 1916 respectively when British and French troops took over those colonies from Germany as part of World War I.

Beginning in 1958, the British West African pound was replaced by local currencies in the individual territories. The replacements were:

Coins

In 1907, aluminium d and cupro-nickel 1d coins were introduced. Both coins were holed. In 1908, cupro-nickel replaced aluminium in the d and, in 1911, holed, cupro-nickel d coins were introduced. In 1913, silver 3d and 6d, 1/– and 2/– were introduced. In 1920, brass replaced silver in these denominations.

In 1938, larger, cupro-nickel 3d coins were introduced, with nickel-brass replacing brass in the higher denominations. In 1952, bronze replaced cupro-nickel in the d, d and 1d coins. The last coins of British West Africa were struck in 1958.

Banknotes

In 1916, the West African Currency Board introduced notes for 2/–, 10/–, and 20/– (£1), followed by 1/– notes in 1918. Only the 10/– and 20/– notes were issued after 1918 until 100/– (£5) notes were introduced in 1953. The last notes were produced in 1962.

See also

 Biafran pound
 British currency in Oceania
 British currency in the Middle East
 British currency in the South Atlantic and the Antarctic
 British currency in the West Indies
 Gambian pound
 Ghanaian pound
 Gold Coast ackey
 Nigerian pound
 West African Monetary Zone
 Economic Community of West African States

References and sources

References

Sources

External links

 Coins from British West Africa

1907 establishments in the British Empire
1968 disestablishments
Pound
Currencies of Ghana
Currencies of the British Empire
Currencies of the Commonwealth of Nations
Currencies of the Gambia
Currencies of Nigeria
Currencies of Cameroon
Currencies of Sierra Leone
Economic history of Nigeria
Economic history of Sierra Leone
Economic history of the Gambia
Gambia Colony and Protectorate
Modern obsolete currencies
Pound (currency)
Sierra Leone Colony and Protectorate